Timothy O'Mahony (born 13 January 1997) is an Irish hurler who plays as a centre-back for club side Newtownshandrum and at centre-forward at inter-county level with the Cork senior hurling team.

Playing career

College

O'Mahony first came to prominence as a hurler with C.B.S. Charleville. Having played hurling in every grade during his time at the school, he usually lined out in the forwards on the senior team in the Harty Cup.

University

During his studies at Mary Immaculate College, O'Mahony was selected for the college's senior hurling team. He was a regular member of the team at various times and won a Fitzgibbon Cup medal as a non-playing substitute in 2017 following a 3-24 to 1-19 defeat of Carlow Institute of Technology.

Club

O'Mahony joined the Newtownshandrum club at a young age and played in all grades at juvenile and underage levels. On 22 June 2014, he made his senior championship debut in a 1-18 to 1-13 defeat of Youghal.

Inter-county

Minor and under-21

O'Mahony first played for Cork at minor level in 2015, however, his sole season in the grade ended without success with a defeat by Limerick. On 23 June 2016, O'Mahony made his first appearance for the Cork under-21 hurling team in a seven-point defeat by Limerick. He also played in Cork's unsuccessful championship campaign in 2017. On 4 July 2018, O'Mahony won a Munster medal after Cork's 2-23 to 1-13 defeat of Tipperary in the final. On 26 August 2018, he scored a point from play in Cork's 3-13 to 1-16 All-Ireland final defeat by Tipperary in what was his last game in the grade. O'Mahony was later nominated for the Team of the Year.

Senior

O'Mahony made his senior debut for Cork on 10 January 2016 when he lined out at right corner-forward in a 1-20 to 0-18 Munster League defeat of Kerry. It was his only game during the campaign and he failed to be included on Cork's National League panel. O'Mahony returned to the Cork team two years later when he played at centre-back in Cork's 1-24 to 0-24 defeat of Kilkenny on 27 January 2018. He lined out in all six of Cork's league games before making his championship debut on 20 May 2018 when he came on as a substitute for Robbie O'Flynn in the 54th minute against Clare. On 1 July 2018, O'Mahony, who missed the game due to a virus, won his first Munster medal as a substitute following a 2-24 to 3-19 defeat of Clare in the final.

Career statistics

Club

Inter-county

Honours

Mary Immaculate College
Fitzgibbon Cup (1): 2017

Cork
Munster Senior Hurling Championship (1): 2018
Munster Under-21 Hurling Championship (1): 2018

References

External link

Tim O'Mahony profile at the Cork GAA website

1997 births
Living people
Newtownshandrum hurlers
Cork inter-county hurlers